Gareh, Lorestan may refer to:
 Gareh, Keshvar
 Gareh, Tang-e Haft